Paralepistopsis amoenolens is an agaric fungus in the Tricholomataceae family. It is commonly known as the paralysis funnel.

Taxonomy 
It was first described in 1975 by the French mycologist Georges Jean Louis Malençon from a specimen found in Morocco and classified as Clitocybe amoenolens.

In 2012, following DNA analysis, Vizzini and Ercole assigned this species to the new genus Paralepistopsis, which forms a separate clade from other Clitocybes.  This change has been accepted by Index Fungorum and the Global Biodiversity Information Facility and so the correct name is currently Paralepistopsis amoenolens.

Toxicity 
It was discovered to be poisonous after several people had consumed specimens all found in the alpine Maurienne valley in the Savoie department over three years. They had mistaken it for the edible common funnel cap (Infundibulicybe sp.) or Paralepista flaccida (formerly Lepista inversa).

The resulting syndrome of fungus-induced erythromelalgia lasted from 8 days to 5 months, although one person exhibited symptoms for three years.

This species contains acromelic acids including Acromelic acid A which is a potent neurotoxin with a chemical formula of C13H14N2O7 and is associated with causing paralysis and seizures

Similar species 
Paralepistopsis acromelalga is a poisonous species known from Japan, commonly called the poison dwarf bamboo mushroom. It had been discovered to be poisonous in 1918.

References

Poisonous fungi
Tricholomataceae
Paralepistopsis
Fungi of Europe